Tetralocularia is a genus of flowering plants belonging to the family Convolvulaceae.

Its native range is Southern Tropical America.

Species:

Tetralocularia pennellii

References

Convolvulaceae
Convolvulaceae genera